Juliane or Juliana of Nassau may mean:
 Juliane of Nassau-Dillenburg (1546-1588), sister of William I of Orange-Nassau
 , daughter of Johann VI, Count of Nassau-Dillenburg
 Juliane of Nassau-Siegen (1587–1643), by marriage landgravine of Hesse-Kassel
 Juliana of the Netherlands (1909-2004), Queen of the Netherlands (1948-1980)

See also 
 Louise Juliana of Nassau (1576-1644), daughter of William I of Orange-Nassau, Princess Palatine by marriage
  (1612-1665), daughter of John VII, Count of Nassau-Siegen